The list of shipwrecks in 1984 includes ships sunk, foundered, grounded, or otherwise lost during 1984.

January

1 January

3 January

5 January

16 January

22 January

24 January

February

1 February

7 February

14 February

15 February

25 February

March

1 March

4 March

12 March

27 March

29 March

30 March

April

11 April

20 April

26 April

28 April

May

16 May

27 May

Unknown date

June

3 June

8 June

9 June

20 June

20 June

July

17 July

23 July

26 July

29 July

30 July

August

3 August

5 August

14 August

20 August

21 August

24 August

26 August

September

2 September

3 September

12 September

17 September

28 September

30 September

October

2 October

29 October

November

2 November

17 November

5 November

13 November

20 November

21 November

22 November

23 November

27 November

29 November

30 November

December

5 December

7 December

23 December

29 December

Unknown date

Unknown date

See also 
 Lists of shipwrecks

References

1984
 
Shipwrecks